The River Thief is a 2016 American teen crime drama written, directed, and co-produced by best-selling novelist N.D. Wilson. The film stars Joel Courtney as Diz, a roving burglar who takes a shine to a small town waitress, Selah, played by Raleigh Cain. The film follows Diz as he tries to steal the affection of Selah and deal with the fallout from his biggest heist yet. The cast includes Paul Johansson, Bas Rutten, and Tommy Cash.

Filmed for $400,000 over the course of ten days with the script completed just 48 hours before production began, The River Thief is the first feature produced by Gorilla Poets (Wilson and co-producer Aaron Rench).

The River Thief received negative reviews. The Los Angeles Times, for example, called it "hackneyed" and "heavy-handed".

References

External links
 

American crime drama films
American teen drama films
2016 films
2010s American films